The third and final season of Rapunzel's Tangled Adventure premiered on October 7, 2019, and concluded on March 1, 2020.

Episodes

Soundtrack

Rapunzel's Tangled Adventure: Plus Est En Vous (Music from the TV Series) is the fourth soundtrack album from the Tangled franchise. It was released on March 6, 2020, by Walt Disney Records.

Track listing

References

Tangled (franchise)
2019 American television seasons
2020 American television seasons
2020 soundtrack albums
Walt Disney Records soundtracks